Royal Club may refer to:

 Royal Club (esports), Chinese professional League of Legends team
 Royal Club (brand), Dutch brand of soft drinks and juices